Knežak is a village on the main road from Postojna to Ilirska Bistrica in the Inner Carniola region of Slovenia. It belongs to the Municipality of Ilirska Bistrica.

The parish church in the settlement is dedicated to the Assumption of Mary and belongs to the Koper Diocese.

The poet, composer, and playwright Miroslav Vilhar (1818–1871) is buried in Knežak.

References

External links

Knežak on Geopedia
Knežak Local Community site

Populated places in the Municipality of Ilirska Bistrica